Steadyfire was an American indie rock band based in Cleveland, Ohio, formed in 2014. The group's final lineup was composed of guitarist-vocalist Gavin McIntire, bassist Garrett Pavlansky, synth player Jade Marié, and drummer Nick Billinghurst. 

The band's music was featured on Rover's Morning Glory in 2015, leading to their addition to the festival Rover Fest alongside late Stone Temple Pilots vocalist Scott Weiland.

Steadyfire released one extended play, Steadyfire (2015), and a studio album, How Often Have I Been This Wrong?, which was released on January 4, 2019. They released two singles in 2016 produced by Skyharbor singer and Grammy nominated engineer Eric Emery. They were signed to independent record label Modest Aeroplane Records, which is owned and operated by band members Gavin McIntire and Jade Marié.

On September 20, 2019, band leader Gavin McIntire made a post to their facebook page announcing that the group had disbanded and would be succeeded by a new project.

Musical style
Steadyfire is typically described as an alternative rock band Vocalist Gavin McIntire has listed a number of acts as influences including Brand New (band), The World Is A Beautiful Place & I Am No Longer Afraid To Die, 
David Bowie, The Hotelier, Manchester Orchestra, Weezer, Modest Mouse, and Explosions In The Sky.

Band members

Former Members
Gavin McIntire – vocals, guitar (2014–2019) piano, synth (2018-2019)
Garrett Pavlansky - bass, backing vocals (2018–2019)
Jade Marié - synth, backing vocals (2018 - 2019)
Nick Billinghurst – drums, percussion (2018–2019)
Jeff Corbin – bass, keyboards (2014-2017)
Grant Cowell - drums (2014-2018)

Discography
Studio albums
How Often Have I Been This Wrong? (2019) 

EPs
Steadyfire (2015)
Singles
Different (2015)
Skeleton (2016)
(Every Time I Do) I Die (2016)
Your Father the Captain (2018)
1967 (2018)
Even If We're The Same (2018)
In Between (2019)
Demos
Reference (2014)

Videography
Music videos
(Every Time I Do) I Die (2016)
Skeleton (2017)
Your Father the Captain (2018)
1967 (2018)
Even If We're The Same (2018)

References

American indie rock groups
Musical groups from Cleveland
Musical groups established in 2014
2014 establishments in Ohio
Emo revival groups
American emo musical groups